Jafarabad is a village in Kavir Rural District, Sheshtaraz District, Khalilabad County, Razavi Khorasan Province, Iran. At the 2006 census, its population was 1,471, in 387 families.

Most of it's population are farmers and they cultivate Pistachio and also Saffron.

References 

Populated places in Khalilabad County